Peter Connell may refer to:
 Peter Connell (cricketer)
 Peter Connell (baseball)
 Peter Connell (footballer)